Nihad Sirees (born 1950) is a Syrian writer. He was born in Aleppo, and studied engineering at university. He emerged as a fiction writer in the 1980s, and till date has written novels, plays, and scripts for TV dramas. Among his notable works are the historical novel The North Winds and the popular TV series The Silk Market, which has been translated for screening in English, Persian and German. He also wrote a TV series about the Lebanese writer Kahlil Gibran. His novel The Silence and the Roar was banned in Syria, and has been translated into German, French and English. His second novel States of Passion, translated by Max Weiss, was published by Pushkin Press in 2018.

In the wake of the Arab Spring, Sirees was targeted for heightened surveillance by the Assad regime, as a result of which he went into exile in 2012. Initially going to Egypt, he now lives in Berlin, Germany.

References

External links
Official website

1950 births
Syrian writers
Refugees and displaced people in fiction
Living people